Marius Iosipoi (born 28 April 2000) is a Moldovan football player who plays for FC Petrocub Hîncești.

Club career
He made his debut in the Russian Football National League for FC Veles Moscow on 27 February 2021 in a game against FC Akron Tolyatti.

International career
He made his debut for Moldova national football team on 28 March 2021 in a World Cup qualifier against Denmark.

References

External links
 
 
 Profile by Russian Football National League

2000 births
Living people
Moldovan footballers
Moldova under-21 international footballers
Moldova international footballers
Association football midfielders
Dacia Buiucani players
FC Veles Moscow players
CS Petrocub Hîncești players
Moldovan Super Liga players
Russian First League players
Moldovan expatriate footballers
Expatriate footballers in Romania
Expatriate footballers in Russia